George Campbell was an association football player who represented New Zealand, playing in New Zealand's first ever official international. He was New Zealand's first national team captain.

Campbell made his full All Whites debut in New Zealand's inaugural A-international fixture, beating Australia 3–1 on 17 June 1922 and ended his international playing career with six  A-international caps to his credit. Campbell scored back-to-back hat-tricks in his final two matches against Australia in June 1923, a 3–2 win and a 4–1 win, in which he scored all four.

References 

Year of birth missing
Year of death missing
New Zealand association footballers
New Zealand international footballers
20th-century New Zealand people
Association football forwards